Noske is a German surname.  Notable people with the surname include:

Anja Noske (born 1986), German rower
Barbara Noske, Dutch cultural anthropologist and philosopher
Bernd Noske (1946-2014), German musician
Johannes Daniël (Daan) Noske (1902–1972), Dutch photographer
Gustav Noske (1868–1946), German Minister of Defence
Mark Noske (born 1975), Australian racecar driver
Klaus Nöske (1911–1978), German fighter pilot during World War II

See also
Gustav Adolf Nosske (1902–1990), German SS officer and Holocaust perpetrator

German-language surnames